Joseph Charles Satterthwaite (March 14, 1900 – November 19, 1990) was an American career diplomat.

Biography

Early life and positions 
Sattherwaite was born in Tecumseh, Michigan on March 14, 1900. His family had first moved to that state in 1831. He attended the University of Michigan, earning a B.A. degree in 1923 and a M.A. degree in 1924. His first job with the US Foreign Service was as a clerk in the Stuttgart consulate in 1926. From there, appointments followed in Guadalajara, Mexico City, Buenos Aires, Baghdad, Ankara and Damascus. As part of a State Department special diplomatic mission, Satterthwaite presented a letter from President Harry S. Truman to King Tribhuvan, recognizing Nepal's independence, on April 21 1947. This task proved difficult, as foreigners could only enter with consent of the Prime Minister, and the group had to travel by rail, road, pack train and sedan chair.

Increasing seniority 
Satterthwaite served as United States Ambassador to Sri Lanka from 1949 to 1952, Head of the U.S. Legation at Tangier from 1953 to 1955, and as United States Ambassador to Burma from April 1955 to April 1957. For a brief period between May 6, 1957 and September 1, 1958, he was Director General of the Foreign Service. He then served as the first Assistant Secretary of State for African Affairs between 1958 and 1961. One of his duties in that role was hosting an African Regional Conference from June 911, 1959 in Lourenco Marques (now Maputo).

South Africa and later career 
Sattherwaite was reappointed as an ambassador, this time to South Africa, from 1961 to 1965. Following the Sharpeville massacre, President John F. Kennedy's administration was taking a renewed look at the country. Satterthwaite later recalled that Kennedy had told him "You can tell the prime minister of South Africa that I'm not sending you out there to point your finger at them, (the South Africans) but that they must realize the problems we have with their racial policy". While in South Africa, Satterthwaite learned of Kennedy's assassination from the Belgian ambassador (who had been listenening to the BBC World Service). This forced him to break off a dinner party he was holding and announce the news, bringing some of the South African guests to tears. His embassy held a Catholic memorial service shortly after.

He spoke highly of his time under the Truman, Eisenhower and Kennedy administrations, saying in an interview that he "never had any pressure from the White House that was objectionable in the least. Obviously pressures were brought by Congress sometimes, but that's something else, that's just par for the course, you can expect that; but certainly not from the White House under either Truman or Eisenhower. I think this is true of Kennedy, too".

After South Africa he retired from the Foreign Service, becoming a consultant on foreign affairs.

He died in Washington, D.C. on November 19, 1990 at the age of 90, due to pneumonia.

References

External links 
Letter from Joseph M Levy recalling Satterthwaite's involvement in "Action on Relief for the Jews in Syria" in 1949
Account of his time as Ambassador to South Africa, given in oral history interview for the JFK Library

1900 births
1990 deaths
Ambassadors of the United States to South Africa
Ambassadors of the United States to Myanmar
Ambassadors of the United States to Sri Lanka
Assistant Secretaries of State for African Affairs
United States Foreign Service personnel
Directors General of the United States Foreign Service
 University of Michigan alumni
20th-century American diplomats